Lamoria fumidea is a species of snout moth in the genus Lamoria. It was described by Whalley in 1964. It is found in China.

References

Moths described in 1964
Tirathabini